Pseudochromis bitaeniatus, the two-lined dottyback, double-striped dottyback, or slender dottyback,  is a species of ray-finned fish in the family Pseudochromidae. It comes from the Indo-West Pacific. It occasionally makes its way into the aquarium trade. It grows to a size of 12 cm in length.

See also 
 List of marine aquarium fish species

References

External links
 

bitaeniatus
Fish of the Indian Ocean
Fish of the Pacific Ocean
Fish described in 1931
Taxa named by Henry Weed Fowler